Mahmoud Ahmad Kojok (born 29 April 1990) is a Lebanese former footballer who played as a midfielder or full-back.

Club career 
Kojok joined Safa on a one-year loan from Ansar on 18 September 2013. On 14 August 2014, Kojok moved to Racing Beirut. He returned from retirement in summer 2021, signing for newly-promoted Sporting.

International career
Kojok played for Lebanon in two friendlies in 2016, against Bahrain and Uzbekistan.

Honours
Ansar
 Lebanese FA Cup: 2011–12
 Lebanese Super Cup: 2012

Safa
 Lebanese Super Cup: 2013

Racing Beirut
 Lebanese Challenge Cup: 2016, 2017

See also
 List of Lebanon international footballers born outside Lebanon

References

External links
 
 
  (2011–2017)
  (2014–2018)
 

1990 births
Living people
Footballers from Abidjan
Lebanese footballers
Association football midfielders
Association football fullbacks
Al Ansar FC players
Safa SC players
Racing Club Beirut players
AC Sporting players
Lebanese Premier League players
Lebanon international footballers